HMS Abingdon was a Hunt-class minesweeper of the Aberdare sub-class built for the Royal Navy during World War I.

Design and description
The Aberdare sub-class were enlarged versions of the original Hunt-class ships with a more powerful armament. The ships displaced  at normal load. The ships' complement consisted of 74 officers and ratings.

The ships had two vertical triple-expansion steam engines, each driving one shaft, using steam provided by two Yarrow boilers.

The Aberdare sub-class was armed with a quick-firing (QF)  gun forward of the bridge and a QF twelve-pounder (76.2 mm) anti-aircraft gun aft. Some ships were fitted with six- or three-pounder guns in lieu of the twelve-pounder.

Construction and career
Following commissioning, Abingdon served with the Aegean Squadron. She remained part of the Aegean Squadron in November 1919, but by January 1920 she was listed as being paid off, although still part of the Mediterranean Fleet. From 1920-1935 she was held in reserve at Malta, then joined the 2nd Minesweeping Flotilla in Malta and Hong Kong. Sweeping was routine until January 1941 when the German Junkers 87s and 88s arrived. Abingdon'''s captain, Lieutenant Graham Simmers, explains: Abingdon was attacked while sweeping, but the ship's slow sweeping speed and steady course seemed to throw the Junkers 87 pilots, as they only scored near-misses; but the Fermoy, bombed while in the dockyard, was a complete write-off.
Graham Simmers describes the end of the ship's career:
 This continued until 5 April 1942 when Abingdon'', while in Kalkara Creek for repairs, was near-missed by two bombs which broke her back. Lieutenant Simmers had her towed out to Bighi Bay, where she was beached and abandoned. The ship was broken up in 1950.

See also

 Abingdon, Oxfordshire, England
 RAF Abingdon
 USS Abingdon (PC-1237)

Notes

References
 
 
 

 

Hunt-class minesweepers (1916)
Royal Navy ship names
1918 ships
Maritime incidents in April 1942